The Lovell Sisters were an American acoustic music trio, known for their tight harmonies and strong instrumental performances. The Lovell Sisters consisted of three permanent members: Jessica, Megan and Rebecca Lovell. Although the band had roots in bluegrass and classical music, the band described its music as progressive acoustic.

Band members 
 Jessica Lovell: lead vocals, fiddle.
 Megan Lovell: harmony vocals, dobro and lap steel.
 Rebecca Lovell: lead and harmony vocals, mandolin and guitar.
 Matt Wingate: acoustic guitar
 Daniel Kimbro: upright bass
 Chad Melton: percussion
 Mike Seal: guitar

Band history
As children, Jessica, Megan, and Rebecca took classical violin and piano lessons and were members of their local youth symphony. They began singing in public with their church choir and credit their classical training with developing their technical ability and teaching them how to practice. The family heard its first bluegrass recording, Slide Rule by Jerry Douglas, and were inspired to check out their local traditional-music scene.

In 2004, the Lovell Sisters Band (LSB) debuted at the Signal Mountain Opry. The next year, The Lovell Sisters appeared on "A Prairie Home Companion" and won the Prairie Home National Teen Talent Competition. The group's first album, When Forever Rolls Around, was released that September.  In 2006, Rebecca won the MerleFest mandolin contest. At 15 years of age, she was the youngest person (and only woman) to win a MerleFest instrument competition.

The Lovell Sisters' song "Distance" won the 2008 John Lennon Songwriting Contest grand prize in the country genre. "Time to Grow" received an honorable mention in the 2008 International Songwriting Competition.

On December 16, 2009, The Lovell Sisters announced that Jessica's wedding engagement and plans to begin college the following year marked the group's disbandment.  Their final concert was at the Harris Arts Center in their hometown of Calhoun, Georgia on January 16, 2010.  Rebecca and Megan regrouped as Larkin Poe and released four EPs, one for each season, and as of 2021, six studio albums.

Discography
 When Forever Rolls Around (as Lovell Sisters Band), 2005, 2DefPigs Records.
 Live at the Philadelphia Folk Festival (DVD), 2008.
 Time to Grow, 2009, 2DefPigs Records.

References

 Kevin Spracher, "The Lovell Sisters at the Lobero Theatre,": The Santa Barbara Independent, 12 July, 2007.
 CD Review, "''When Forever Rolls Around",": Bluegrass Unlimited, March, 2006.
 Bill Colrus, "Doing Things Differently," The Pulse, Chattanooga, 16 May 2007.

External links
The Lovell Sisters collection at the Internet Archive's live music archive
Website of Larkin Poe, Lovell Sisters Rebecca & Megan Lovell

Musical groups from Georgia (U.S. state)